Sylhet Medical University is a government medical university situated in Sylhet, Bangladesh.

History
Many medical colleges have been established in the country for commercial reasons. Many closed medical colleges have been started due to court order. According to the Prime Minister's order to strictly monitor whether medical standards are being properly maintained in medical colleges, a medical university will be set up in each division. According to the order, Chittagong and Rajshahi Medical University have already been established. Sylhet Medical University is the fourth medical university of the directive.

List of vice-chancellors 

Murshed Ahmed Chowdhury (2018–present)

References 

Education in Sylhet District
Educational institutions established in 2017
2017 establishments in Bangladesh
Public Medical University of Bangladesh
Medical universities in Bangladesh